Brendan Yarema (born July 16, 1976) is a Canadian retired professional ice hockey centre who played in North American minor leagues and throughout Europe.

Career
Yarema played junior hockey for the Newmarket Royals of the OHL starting in the 1993–94 season. Following the culmination of the season, the team was sold to the Ciccarelli brothers and moved to Sarnia, becoming the Sarnia Sting. Yarema would play for the Sting for two further seasons before turning professional.

Yarema began his professional career in 1996 when he joined the ECHL's South Carolina Stingrays, for whom he played 12 regular season games, as well as a further 9 in the playoffs, helping the Stingrays to win the Kelly Cup. During the season he also played for the St. John's Maple Leafs in the AHL, playing 9 games.

The 1997–98 season would see Yarema move to the Kentucky Thoroughblades also of the AHL, playing 64 games, registering 22 points. Yarema would then move to the IHL's Kansas City Blades for whom we would play for two seasons. The London Knights of the BISL would be Yarema's team for the 2000–01 season. The Knights fared well both domestically and in continental competition, narrowly losing the IIHF Continental Cup to Swiss outfit ZSC Lions, having beaten the Munich Barons and HC Slovan Bratislava in the final group stage.

Following the year in London, Yarema returned to North America to play for the AHL's Houston Aeros for the 2001–02 season. Yarema stayed in the AHL for the following season for the Cincinnati Mighty Ducks, as well as playing 5 games for the ECHL's Charlotte Checkers. For the 2003-04 AHL season, Yarema played for the Chicago Wolves. The following season, Yarema initially played for the AHL's Bridgeport Sound Tigers before being picked up mid-season by the Milwaukee Admirals.

Yarema then moved to Germany in order to play for DEL side Augsburger Panther. He would have a career year in south Germany, posting 23 goals and 42 points in 48 games. For the 2006–07 season, Yarema would dress for two teams; SC Langnau in the Swiss NLA, and Swedish side Rögle BK of the HockeyAllsvenskan. Slovenia would be Yarema's next port of call, playing in the capital for Olimpija Ljubljana in the EBEL during the 2007–08 season. During the season, Yarema would also ice for Olimpija's Slovenian Ice Hockey League side during the playoffs, where the team would lose in the final to HK Jesenice. Yarema would play for Olimpija for two further seasons before retiring at the culmination of the 2009–10 season.

Career Statistics

Regular season and playoffs

References

External links
 

1976 births
Augsburger Panther players
Bridgeport Sound Tigers players
Canadian expatriate ice hockey players in Sweden
Canadian ice hockey centres
Charlotte Checkers (2010–) players
Chicago Wolves players
Cincinnati Mighty Ducks players
HDD Olimpija Ljubljana players
Houston Aeros (1994–2013) players
Ice hockey people from Ontario
Kansas City Blades players
Kentucky Thoroughblades players
Living people
London Knights (UK) players
Milwaukee Admirals players
Rögle BK players
SC Langnau players
South Carolina Stingrays players
Sportspeople from Sault Ste. Marie, Ontario
St. John's Maple Leafs players